Charles Yorke (1722–1770) was Lord Chancellor of Great Britain.

Charles Yorke may also refer to:

 Charles Yorke, 4th Earl of Hardwicke (1799–1873), British naval commander and Conservative politician
 Charles Yorke, 5th Earl of Hardwicke (1836–1897), British aristocrat, Conservative politician, dandy and bankrupt
 Charles Yorke (British Army officer) (1790–1880)
 Charles Philip Yorke (1764–1834), British politician